"Butterfly Dance" was the second Kevin Ayers single. It was an exclusive release that did not appear on the contemporaneous album Shooting at the Moon. The flip side was a French-language version of Ayers’ "May I?".

Track listing

"Butterfly Dance" (Kevin Ayers)
"Puis Je?"  (Kevin Ayers)

Personnel 
Kevin Ayers / Guitar, bass, Vocals
David Bedford / organ, piano, accordion
Lol Coxhill / Saxophone
Mike Oldfield / Bass, Guitar
Mick Fincher / Drums, percussion
The Ladybirds / Backing Vocals

External links
"May I? ("Puis Je?")" performance 1972

Kevin Ayers songs
1970 singles
Songs written by Kevin Ayers
1970 songs
Harvest Records singles